Dichagyris salina is a species of cutworm or dart moth in the family Noctuidae. It was first described by William Barnes in 1904, and it is found in North America.

The MONA or Hodges number for Dichagyris salina is 10873.

References

Further reading

 
 
 

salina
Articles created by Qbugbot
Moths described in 1904